Handy is a surname, and may refer to:

 Alexander Hamilton Handy (1809–1883), Mississippi jurist
 Arthur Handy (born 1967), American politician 
 Chantelle Handy (born 1987), British basketball player 
 Charles Handy, Irish management guru and author
 Chris Handy (born 1950), Australian rugby union football player
 Craig Handy (born 1962), American tenor saxophonist
 Ellen Handy, American art historian and critic
 Ellice Handy (1902–1989), Singaporean educator
 Emma Handy (born 1974), British actress
 E. M. Handy (1904–1975), American football coach
 George Handy (1920–1997), American jazz arranger, composer and pianist
 Henryk Handy (1940–2007), Polish ice hockey player 
 Jam Handy (1886–1983), American swimmer and water polo player
 James Handy, American film actor
 Jim Handy, American politician from Maine
 John Handy (born 1933), American jazz musician
 John C. Handy (1844–1891), American physician
 John Killeen Handy (politician), politician in Queensland, Australia
 John W. Handy (born 1944), United States Air Force officer
 Captain John Handy (1900–1971), American jazz alto saxophonist
 Laura Handy (born 1980), American pair skater
 Levin Corbin Handy (1855–1932), American photographer
 L. Irving Handy (1861–1922), American educator, lawyer and politician
 Margaret Irving Handy (1889–1977), American pediatrician
 Nicholas C. Handy, Professor of Quantum chemistry, University of Cambridge
 Phil Handy (born 1971), American basketball coach
 Ron Handy (born 1963), Canadian ice hockey player
 Stephen Handy (born 1951), American politician 
 Thomas T. Handy, United States Army general
 Wayne Handy (born 1935), American rock and roll singer
 W. C. Handy, the "Father of the Blues"